United Nations Security Council resolution 1018, adopted unanimously on 7 November 1995, after noting the death of International Court of Justice (ICJ) judge Andrés Aguilar-Mawdsley on 24 October 1995, the Council decided that elections to the vacancy on the ICJ would take place on 28 February 1996 at the Security Council and at a meeting of the General Assembly during its 50th session.

Mawdsley, a Venezuelan jurist and former Minister of Justice, was a member of the court since 1991. His term of office was due to expire in February 2000.

See also
 Judges of the International Court of Justice
 List of United Nations Security Council Resolutions 1001 to 1100 (1995–1997)

References

External links
 
Text of the Resolution at undocs.org

 1018
 1018
November 1995 events